Kąkolewo may refer to the following places in Poland:
Kąkolewo, Gmina Grodzisk Wielkopolski in Greater Poland Voivodeship (west-central Poland)
Kąkolewo, Leszno County in Greater Poland Voivodeship (west-central Poland)
Kąkolewo, Ostrów Wielkopolski County in Greater Poland Voivodeship (west-central Poland)